Faithe Herman (born December 27, 2007) is an American actress, best known for her work in This Is Us (2016) and Shazam! (2019).

Career
After appearing as Annie Pearson in the 2016 television show This Is Us, Herman landed her first major film role in Shazam! (2019) as Darla Dudley, who will also reprise the role in the sequel Shazam! Fury of the Gods (2023).

Accolades
Herman won two Screen Actors Guild Awards in the same category for Outstanding Performance by an Ensemble in a Drama Series for her work on This Is Us, in 2018 and 2019.

Personal life 
Herman  was born in 2007 in San Diego, California. She is the youngest child of five siblings.

Filmography

Film

Television

References

External links
 

21st-century American actresses
American child actresses
Living people
Place of birth missing (living people)
2007 births
People from San Diego